Lajpat Rai Law College or L. R. Law College is a Government Law Institute situated at Hans Nagar in Sambalpur in the Indian state of Odisha. It offers 3 years and 5 years Integrated B.B.A., LL.B. course approved by the Bar Council of India (BCI) and it is affiliated to Sambalpur University.

History
Lajpat Rai Law College was established in 1965 by the Sambalpur Trust Fund and initially was under the jurisdiction of Utkal University. Latter after the creation of Sambalpur University it came under the jurisdiction of it.

References 

Education in Sambalpur
Educational institutions established in 1965
1965 establishments in Orissa
Universities and colleges in Odisha
Law schools in Odisha